Akhalkalaki is a town in Georgia's southern region of Samtskhe–Javakheti and the administrative centre of the Akhalkalaki Municipality. Akhalkalaki lies on the edge of the Javakheti Plateau. The town's recorded history goes back to the 11th century. As of the 2014 Georgian census the town had a population of 8,295, with 93.8% Armenian majority.

Etymology 
The name Akhalkalaki, first recorded in the 11th-century Georgian chronicle, means "a new town", from Georgian [ɑxɑli], "new", and [kʰɑlɑkʰi], "city" or "town". The 19th-century ethnographic accounts have another Armenian name for the town, Nor-Kaghak, also meaning "a new town".

History
Akhalkalaki was founded by Bagrat IV of Georgia in 1064. In 1066, the city was destroyed during the Seljuq invasions of the Kingdom of Georgia. In the 11th century, Akhalkalaki became one of the political and economical centres of Javakheti. In the 16th century, the city came under the rule of the Ottoman Empire and became a sanjak centre in Çıldır Eyaleti. Under the Ottoman rule, the town was known as "Ahılkelek". The city was passed from the Ottomans to the Russians after the Russo-Turkish War in 1828–1829. On January 4, 1900, an earthquake destroyed much of the town and killed 1,000 people in the area. The citizens predominantly dwelled in dugouts till the 1920s. The city was the administrative center of the Akhalkalaki uezd of the Tiflis Governorate. In May 1918, the town and its district were occupied by the Ottoman army until their withdrawal by the Armistice of Mudros—the occupation resulted in the exodus of the local Armenian population which nearly perished due to starvation and disease.

Population

By the time of the region's annexation to the Russian Empire in 1829, the population was mainly Islamicized Georgians. After the Russian takeover, most of the Muslim Georgians left the area for the Ottoman Empire, and in their place Christian Armenian refugees from Erzurum and Bayazid settled here. Since then the city and the region of Javakheti has been largely populated by Armenians.

Climate 
The climate of Akhalkalaki is moderately humid with relative cold dry winters and long cool summers. (Köppen: Dfb)

Transport 

The crossroads village meets from south the streets from the border to Armenia and Turkey, from north to Borjomi–Gori and east–west from Batumi to Tiflis south of the Lesser Caucasus.

The junction from the line Tbilisi–Yerevan is in Marabda.

In April 2005, an agreement was signed to build a new railway connecting Turkey with Georgia and Azerbaijan, passing nearby Akhalkalaki. This would bypass an existing line through Gyumri in Armenia which has been closed by Turkey, blockading Armenia, for political reasons since the 1990s. The railway  became operational on October 30, 2017. It is here where the break-of-gauge is.

In compound with the military base was constructed an airport. With military dismantling it was closed.

Bases 

The city was home to the Soviet-era 147th Motor Rifle Division (part of the 9th Army of the Transcaucasian Military District) up until the early 1990s. After the fall of the Soviet Union, the Division became the Russian 62nd Military Base. It was officially transferred, according to the Sochi agreement, to Georgia on June 27, 2007.

On September 19, 2020, a new basic combat training center was opened on the site of the former base in Akhalkalaki. The center is designed to accommodate and train up to 800 military personnel and conscripts.

Notable people
 Derenik Demirchian, Armenian writer
 Jivani, Armenian bard
 Harutyun Khachatryan, Armenian film director
 Ruben Ter-Minasian, Defense Minister of the First Republic of Armenia
 Hamo Ohanjanyan, the third Prime Minister of the First Republic of Armenia
 Aik Mnatsakanian, Armenian wrestler representing Bulgaria
 Hakob Hakobyan, professional football player
 Arman Tsarukyan, Armenian mixed martial artist

See also
Samtskhe–Javakheti

References

External links 

Cities and towns in Samtskhe–Javakheti
Tiflis Governorate
Armenian diaspora communities